The Harmony Township School District is a comprehensive community public school district that serves students in pre-kindergarten through eighth grade from Harmony Township, in Warren County, New Jersey, United States.

As of the 2021–22 school year, the district, comprised of one school, had an enrollment of 200 students and 30.0 classroom teachers (on an FTE basis), for a student–teacher ratio of 6.7:1.

The district is classified by the New Jersey Department of Education as being in District Factor Group "DE", the fifth-highest of eight groupings. District Factor Groups organize districts statewide to allow comparison by common socioeconomic characteristics of the local districts. From lowest socioeconomic status to highest, the categories are A, B, CD, DE, FG, GH, I and J.

Public school students in ninth through twelfth grades attend Belvidere High School, together with students from Hope Township and White Township, as part of sending/receiving relationships with the Belvidere School District. As of the 2021–22 school year, the high school had an enrollment of 357 students and 32.3 classroom teachers (on an FTE basis), for a student–teacher ratio of 11.1:1.

Schools
Schools in the district (with 2021–22 enrollment data from the National Center for Education Statistics) are:
Harmony Township School, with 200 students in grades PreK-8
Daryle Weiss, Principal

Administration
Core members of the districts' administration are:
Christopher Carrubba, Chief School Administrator
Rachelle Tjalma, Business Administrator / Board Secretary

Board of education
The district's board of education is comprised of nine members who set policy and oversee the fiscal and educational operation of the district through its administration. As a Type II school district, the board's trustees are elected directly by voters to serve three-year terms of office on a staggered basis, with three seats up for election each year held (since 2012) as part of the November general election.

References

External links
Harmony Township School
 
School Data for the Harmony Township School, National Center for Education Statistics
Belvidere High School

Harmony Township, New Jersey
New Jersey District Factor Group DE
School districts in Warren County, New Jersey
Public K–8 schools in New Jersey